USS Stockham or USNS Stockham may refer to more than one United States Navy ship:

 , a destroyer in commission from 1944 to 1946 and from 1951 to 1957 
 , ex-USNS Soderman (T-AKR-299),  a container and roll-on roll-off ship, acquired in 1997 for service in a non-commissioned status with the Military Sealift Command and still in active service

United States Navy ship names